Anand Lok Sabha constituency is one of the 26 Lok Sabha (parliamentary) constituencies in Gujarat state in Western India.

Assembly segments
Presently, Anand Lok Sabha constituency comprises seven Vidhan Sabha (legislative assembly) segments. These are:

Members of Parliament

Election results

General Elections 2004

This is the result of 2004 Lok Sabha elections.

General Elections 2009 

This is the result of 2009 Lok Sabha election.

General Election 2014

2019

See also
 Anand District
 List of Constituencies of the Lok Sabha

Notes

Lok Sabha constituencies in Gujarat
Anand district